The 1916 United States presidential election in Arizona took place on November 7, 1916, as part of the 1916 United States presidential election. State voters chose three representatives, or electors, to the Electoral College, who voted for president and vice president.

Arizona was won by Democratic incumbent President Woodrow Wilson, running with incumbent Vice President Thomas R. Marshall, with 57.17% of the popular vote, against Republican Associate Justice of the U.S. Supreme Court Charles Evans Hughes, running with former Vice President Charles W. Fairbanks under Theodore Roosevelt's second term, with 35.37% of the popular vote. Socialist nominee Allan L. Benson ran with George Ross Kirkpatrick, finishing in a distant third place with just 5.47%, a significant decrease from 13.33% in 1912.

Despite Republican hopes of unifying the party after a catastrophic split four years prior, Democrat Woodrow Wilson was still able to win a solid majority (57.17%) improving on his 43.5% vote in 1912. Many Arizonans who voted for left wing Socialist candidate Eugene V. Debs in their first presidential election sided with progressive Democratic President Wilson for re-election over Republican nominee Charles E. Hughes who ran as a moderate in hopes of unifying the progressive wing that had earlier split from the party by former President Theodore Roosevelt and the conservative faction led by former President William Howard Taft.

Woodrow Wilson won every county in Arizona except for Pima County which voted for him by one of the smallest percentages in 1912.

Results

Results by county

References

Arizona
1916
1916 Arizona elections